The VRA Rescue NSW (VRA) is an Australian organisation of volunteer members, they provide rescue to the communities across New South Wales. The first rescue squads, with the assistance of NSW Police formed the Volunteer Rescue Association (now called VRA Rescue NSW), groups with common charters can become an affiliate of the Association.

In times of need, whether it be in the emergency or recovery phase, the VRA can bring affiliated squads together to provide assistance to other services or to assist one of its own affiliates.

The first VRA specialist squad, Bushwalkers Search and Rescue (today known as NSW SES Bush Search and Rescue) was formed in 1936. The first VRA General Land Rescue Squad was formed in 1950 to assist Police with recovery of persons from the Murrumbidgee River, to provide flood rescue, evacuations and ferrying of food and medicines between isolated communities around Wagga Wagga in southern NSW.  Soon after the Wagga Wagga Rescue Squad became involved in general land rescue. In 1960 the Bourke Rescue Squad was formed, followed in 1962 by the Dubbo Rescue Squad. In 1969, at the suggestion of the State Police Commissioner several volunteer rescue squads (Albury, Dubbo, Narrandera and Wagga Wagga) met and formed the Volunteer Rescue Association. VRA Rescue Squads (Such as The Mudgee Rescue Squad in Jan 1975) continued to be established where a need existed and the Police, Ambulance, Fire Brigade and local community supported the establishment of a volunteer rescue squad.

Today, VRA Rescue NSW provides a training structure with CBT Competency Based Training under its own Registered Training Organisation VRA Training Pty Ltd (#40468) (Now RFS Training more info to come), and with policies and procedures affiliated rescue squads provide a comprehensive rescue service to the community. VRA Rescue NSW provides a command structure when rescue squads come together, during major incidents, with standardisation of equipment, all come together as a cohesive team.

Regional squads can be either land or marine based. Land-based squads can be involved with motor vehicle accident rescue, vertical rescue, river rescue and dive rescue. Marine-based squads can be involved with coastal emergencies on the north and south coast. In addition, there are specialist squads with particular skills who do not operate in any particular region. Examples of these include squads with bushwalking, cave rescue, radio (communications), Australian Civil Air Patrol (aircraft), and dog expertise.

The current Commissioner of VRA Rescue NSW is Brenton Charlton.

Major Incidents Attended 

VRA Rescue NSW is involved on a day-to-day basis in general rescue operations primarily, road accident rescue, land and maritime search and rescue operations. This extensive experience is invaluable in times of major operations. VRA Rescue NSW has responded to the following major incidents:

 1974 Cyclone Tracy - Darwin ( Rescue - 124 personnel and equipment available within 6 hours - not responded);
 1977 Granville train disaster (Rescue - two Rescue Squads responded);
 Clybucca [Kempsey] Bus Crash (Rescue);
 1989 Newcastle Earthquake [Newcastle Workers Club Collapse] (Rescue - Two (2) Rescue Squads responded immediately and subsequently 100 operators and support personnel to sustain 24-hour operations);
 Nyngan Flood (assisted Police with evacuations);
 1994 Bush Fire Emergency (Assist Police and Ambulance with evacuations, provide communications support (CREST and WICEN) and provide welfare support to firefighters - 315 personnel);
 1997 Thredbo landslide;
 During 1999 the VRA provided assistance to the State Emergency Service during the Sydney Hailstorm Operations and the Department of Agriculture during the Mangrove Mountain Newcastle Disease outbreak.

While assisting at these major operations, VRA units continued to meet their primary responsibility of providing rescue services to their communities.

Volunteering 
As with many volunteer organisations, an increasing number of VRA squads face difficulties recruiting sufficient personnel in order to respond effectively to incidents. This has led to a gradual decline in the number of accredited squads from 47 in 2007 down to 32 by 2013, with responsibility moving to other organisations such as Fire and Rescue NSW and the State Emergency Service.
Though VRA Rescue NSW have received Government funding for new vehicles, equipment and training, to help keep the community safe.
This new funding means the VRA Rescue NSW will receive $18.8 million over four years.

References

External links

 NSW Volunteer Rescue Association Website
 Wagga Wagga Rescue Squad Website
 Bush Search and Rescue New South Wales
 NSW Cave Rescue Squad Website
 Australian Civil Air Patrol Website
 WICEN NSW Inc
 https://www.facebook.com/MudgeeRescueSquad/

Emergency services in New South Wales